Kalvøysund is a village in Arendal municipality in Agder county, Norway.

Military History 
Kalvøysund was the site of an old German fortress to defend the coastline during the German occupation of Norway in WW2. It was located on the island of Flostaøya. This fortress was one of the largest, being 10 aces in area. The fortress included 50 bunkers and other buildings and 4 emplacements for artillery. After WW2 ended and Norway liberated, the Norwegian armed forces used it for military exercises. Now it is in the possession of the local authorities and is a tourist destination.

References
1. "Kalvøysund, Arendal (Aust-Agder)". yr.no. Retrieved 9 December 2017.
 2. Turistkontor, Arendal. “Kalvøysund Fort.” Visitnorway, Innovation Norway, 20 Sept. 2020, https://www.visitnorway.com/places-to-go/southern-norway/arendal/listings-arendal/kalv%C3%B8ysund-fort/7064/. 

Villages in Agder
Arendal